The women's Individual Pursuit B track cycling event at the 2016 Summer Paralympics took place on September 11. This class is for blind and visually impaired cyclists riding with a sighted pilot. Fourteen pairs from 10 different nations compete.

The competition began with seven head to head races between the 14 riders. These races were held over a 3000m course (12 laps of the standard velodrome)  and each rider is given a time for their race. The fastest two riders are advanced to the gold medal final whilst the third and fourth fastest times race it out for the bronze. The medal finals are held on the same day as the heats.

Preliminaries
Q = Qualifier for gold final
Qb = Qualifier for bronze final
PR = Paralympic Record
WR = World Record

Finals 
Gold medal match

Bronze medal match

References

Women's pursuit B